The 2016–17 season was Real Madrid's 86th in existence, their 34th consecutive season in the top flight of Spanish basketball and 10th consecutive season in the top flight of European basketball. The club was involved in four competitions.

Players

Squad information

Depth chart

Players in

|}

Total spending:  €0

Players out

|}

Total income:  €0

Total expenditure: €0

Club

Technical staff

Kit
Supplier: Adidas / Sponsor: Teka

Pre-season and friendlies

Competitions

Overall

Overview

Supercopa de España

Liga ACB

League table

Results summary

Results by round

Matches

Results overview

EuroLeague

League table

Results summary

Results by round

Matches

Results overview

Euroleague Playoffs

Quarterfinals

Copa del Rey

Statistics

Liga ACB

EuroLeague

Copa del Rey

Supercopa de España

References

External links
 Official website
 Real Madrid at ACB.com 
 Real Madrid at EuroLeague.net

 
Real
Madrid